Orionella is a genus of beetle in the family Carabidae, with four known species as of April 2013:
 Orionella lewisii (Bates, 1873)
 Orionella obenbergeri Jedlička, 1963
 Orionella discoidalis (Bates, 1892)
 Orionella kathmanduensis (Kirschenhofer, 1994)

References

Lebiinae